The year 1927 in television involved some significant events.
Below is a list of television-related events during 1927.


Global television events

Births

References